A chansonnier (Galician and ,  or canzoniéro) is a manuscript or printed book which contains a collection of chansons, or polyphonic and monophonic settings of songs, hence literally "song-books"; however, some manuscripts are called chansonniers even though they preserve the text but not the music, for example, the Cancioneiro da Vaticana and Cancioneiro da Biblioteca Nacional, which contain the bulk of Galician-Portuguese lyrics.

The most important chansonniers contain lyrics, poems and songs of the troubadours and trouvères used in the medieval music. Prior to 1420, many song-books contained both sacred and secular music, one exception being those containing the work of Guillaume de Machaut. Around 1420, sacred and secular music was segregated into separate sources, with large choirbooks containing sacred music, and smaller chansonniers for more private use by the privileged. Chansonniers were compiled primarily in France, but also in Italy, Germany and in the Iberian peninsula.

List of chansonniers

Catalan

French
Cangé Chansonnier
Cappella Giulia Chansonnier
Casanatense chansonnier
Chansonnier Cordiforme
Chansonnier de Arras
Chansonnier du Roi (also Occitan)
Chansonnier Nivelle de la Chaussée
Copenhagen Chansonnier
Dijon Chansonnier
Florentine Chansonnier
Laborde Chansonnier
Mellon Chansonnier
Noailles Chansonnier
Seville Chansonnier
Wolfenbüttel Chansonnier

Italian
Cancionero de Montecassino

Occitan

Cançoner Gil
Cançoner Vega-Aguiló
Chansonnier de Saint-Germain-des-Prés
Philipps Manuscript
Poetarum Provinciali

Galician-Portuguese
Cancioneiro da Ajuda
Cancioneiro da Biblioteca Nacional
Cancioneiro da Vaticana
Pergaminho Sharrer (fragment)
Pergaminho Vindel see Martin Codax

Portuguese
Cancioneiro de Belém
Cancioneiro de Elvas
Cancioneiro de Lisboa
Cancioneiro de Paris

Spanish
Cancionero de Baena
Cancionero de la Colombina
Cancionero de Medinaceli
Cancionero de Palacio
Cancionero de Segovia

References
Howard Mayer Brown. "Chansonnier (i)", Grove Music Online, ed. L. Macy (accessed July 30, 2006), grovemusic.com.

Books by type